"Come with a Friend" was the second single by the Irish art rock quartet, Director. It was released on 29 September 2006. Although not as popular as the band's debut single Reconnect, the single charted in Ireland at number twenty-six, and went on to spend three weeks in the Irish Singles Chart.

entertainment.ie noted the song for its "breezy effervessence".

Live performances 
"Come with a Friend" was performed on The Late Late Show, and also on an episode of The Cafe on 19 October 2006.

Chart performance

References

External links
 Official band website
 

2006 singles
Director (band) songs
2006 songs
Atlantic Records singles